This is a list of VTV dramas released in 2007.

←2006 - 2007 - 2008→

VTV Tet dramas
These short dramas air on VTV channels during Tet holiday.

VTV1

VTV3

VTV1 Weeknight Prime-time dramas
Starting on 20 September 2007, VTV launched the first prime time slot for Vietnamese dramas. 

These dramas air from 21:10 to 22:00, Monday to Friday on VTV1.
Note: Cỏ lông chông airs in prime time but not officially prime time slot for only Vietnamese dramas. The drama was followed by Korean period drama Jumong from 7 March to 19 September.

VTV3 Cinema For Saturday Afternoon dramas
These dramas air in early Saturday afternoon on VTV3 with the duration approximately 70 minutes as a part of the program Cinema for Saturday afternoon (Vietnamese: Điện ảnh chiều thứ Bảy).

VTV3 Sunday Literature & Art dramas
These dramas air in early Sunday afternoon on VTV3 as a part of the program Sunday Literature & Art (Vietnamese: Văn nghệ Chủ Nhật).

See also
 List of dramas broadcast by Vietnam Television (VTV)
 List of dramas broadcast by Hanoi Radio Television (HanoiTV)
 List of dramas broadcast by Vietnam Digital Television (VTC)

References

External links
VTV.gov.vn – Official VTV Website 
VTV.vn – Official VTV Online Newspaper 

Vietnam Television original programming
2007 in Vietnamese television